Local elections were held in Jordan on 27 August 2003 to elect municipal and local councils.

See also
Municipal council
Local council

References

2003 in Jordan
2003
2003 elections in Asia